Pinheirodontidae is a poorly known family of fossil mammals which belong to the informal suborder "Plagiaulacida" within the order Multituberculata. Remains are known from the Late Jurassic to Early Cretaceous of Europe, (predominantly Portugal and Spain), but are so far restricted to teeth.

The family Pinheirodontidae was named by Hahn G. and Hahn R. in 1999, after the locality of Porto Dinheiro, in central west Portugal.

References
 Hahn & Hahn (1999), "Pinheirodontidae n. fam. (Multituberculata) (Mammalia) aus der tiefen Unter-Kreide Portugals". Palaeontographica Abt. A Vol. 253, pp. 77–222. (Pinheirodontidae n. fam. (Multituberculata) (Mammalia) from the deepest Lower Cretaceous of Portugal).
 Kielan-Jaworowska Z & Hurum JH (2001), "Phylogeny and Systematics of multituberculate mammals". Paleontology 44, p. 389-429.
 Much of this information has been derived from  MESOZOIC MAMMALS; Basal Multituberculata, an Internet directory.

Multituberculates
Early Cretaceous mammals
Cretaceous Europe
Late Jurassic first appearances
Early Cretaceous extinctions
Prehistoric mammal families
Fossil taxa described in 1999